Anger Management is a collaborative mixtape between American musicians Rico Nasty and Kenny Beats. It was released independently on April 25, 2019 through Rico Nasty's label Sugar Trap as a surprise release. Featured artists on the record include Baauer, Splurge, and EarthGang.

Background and release 
Rico Nasty and Kenny Beats recorded the entire project within a five day session in early 2019. On March 24, 2019, Rico Nasty announced the project on Instagram live and noted that it will "probably come out in April [2019]." On why she kept the project a secret from her fans, Rico said: "I want you guys to really enjoy it and I want you guys to let me enjoy creating it and not be rushing to finish." She announced its imminent release on April 24, 2020 and released the promotional single, "Big Titties". Anger Management was officially released on April 25, 2019.

Cover artwork 
The mixtape's cover art was created by Keith Rankin, and was inspired by the cover of the 1991 psychology book, The New Primal Scream, by Arthur Janov. Dom Glover, the creative director of the project, originally approached Rankin with this cover as inspiration. Rankin told The Fader, "As soon as I saw that idea I had a pretty clear image of what it should be, just a straight up view of Rico’s face with the gradient background." The cover art was created using the pen and airbrush tools on Photoshop.

Composition 
Musically, Anger Management was noted by critics to be a hip hop record with elements of trap, punk rap, metal, and nu-metal.

Critical response

Reception

Anger Management received positive acclaim from music critics. At Metacritic, which assigns a normalized rating out of 100 to reviews from professional publications, the mixtape received an average score of 79, based on 4 reviews. Album of the Year collected 6 reviews and calculated an average of 74 out of 100.

Kyann-Sian Williams of NME described the mixtape as a "bracing, addictive record" which "takes the listener on a journey through anger to acceptance, finally arriving at a sense of calm. It's a great concept, and a great album." Lakin Starling of Pitchfork described the record as "a hell of a rap-production slapper, but most of all it's a turning point in Rico's evolution," noting that "[Rico] remains one of the heaviest hitters in the no-rules arena of rap." Nathan Ma of Highsnobiety wrote "At its heart, Anger Management is an overwhelmingly visceral, engaging, and consuming project," and concluded that "Rico Nasty is, among other things, a professional." Danny Schwart of Rolling Stone praised the collaborative efforts of the project and the energy between the duo, writing, "This overpowering 18-minute release reveals Rico and Kenny to be the most high-voltage rapper-producer combo around. [...] the progression they've achieved on Anger Management, indicate that Rico and Kenny will probably be career-long collaborators. Rico is only 21 and her future is incredibly bright — especially with Kenny at her side to help her realize her potential."

In a slightly more negative review, Daniel Spielberg of HipHopDX noted that "Instead of replicating last year's [Nasty], [Rico Nasty] is clearly set on experimenting and expanding her sound. Even though it shows that she's a risk taker, Anger Management is unfortunately half-baked."

Accolades
Anger Managagement appeared on multiple critic's lists.

Track listing
Credits adapted from Tidal and ASCAP.

Sample Credits
 "Hatin" contains a sample from "Dirt Off Your Shoulder", written by Shawn Corey Carter and Timothy Mosley, as performed by Jay-Z. 
 "Relative" contains a sample from "Can't Be Wasting My Time", written by Christopher Martin, Lawrence Parker, Johntá Austin, Andre Evans, and Alfred Antoine, as performed by Mona Lisa.

Personnel
Credits adapted from Tidal.

 Kenny Beats – producer 
 Rico Nasty – vocals 
 Baauer – producer 
 Harry Fraud – uncredited co-producer 
 Splurge – vocals 
 Nils – uncredited co-producer 
 Jozzy – writer 
 The Crate League – uncredited co-producer 
 Alex Tumay – mixer 
 Joe LaPorta – mastering engineer

References 

2019 mixtape albums
Collaborative albums
Rico Nasty albums
Albums produced by Kenny Beats